Xylocopa rufitarsis is a species of carpenter bee native to South Africa. It has been assigned to the subgenus Xylomelissa. It was seen to visit flowers of a wide range of plants, many of them Fabaceae such as Acacia karroo, Aspalathus linearis, A. spinescens, Calpurnia glabrata, Lebeckia multiflora, Lebeckia sericea, peas (Pisum sativum) and Tipuana tipu, but also Agave sp., Anchusa capensis, Hermannia gariepina, Lobostemon trichotomus, Moraea cookii, Populus sp., Prenia pallens, Zygophyllum morgsana, Salvia dentata and other Lamiaceae. Nests of been found in Metalasia muricata, Psoralea aphylla and Pinus sp. They are parasitized by Anthrax badius.

References

rufitarsis
Hymenoptera of Africa
Insects of South Africa
Insects described in 1841
Taxa named by Amédée Louis Michel le Peletier